Survival craft station (also: survival craft radio station) is – according to Article 1.65 of the International Telecommunication Union´s (ITU) radio regulations – defined as A mobile station in the maritime mobile service or the aeronautical mobile service intended solely for survival purposes and located on any lifeboat, life-craft or other survival equipment.

Each station shall be classified by the service in which it operates permanently or temporarily.

See also

References / sources 

 International Telecommunication Union (ITU)

Radio stations and systems ITU
Maritime communication